Tonelero (S21) was an Oberon-class submarine in the Brazilian Navy.

Design and construction

The submarine, built by Vickers Shipbuilding and Engineering at their shipyard in Barrow, was laid down on 18 November 1971, and launched on 22 November 1972. During construction, a fire seriously damaged the submarine. The submarine was towed to Chatham Dockyard, where the  central section was cut out and replaced. The fire was found to have originated in the cabling, and prompted the recabling of all under-construction Oberons. She was commissioned into the Brazilian Navy on 10 December 1977.

Operational history

Decommissioning and fate

Tonelero was listed as active in the 1998-99 edition of Jane's Fighting Ships.

On 26 December 2000 the Tonelero sank at her mooring in the Rio de Janeiro navy yards due to crew error. All 9 crew members aboard escaped from the submarine.

See also
 Ships of the Brazilian Navy

References

External links
 The Submarine Heritage Centre - Brazilian "O" Class

Oberon-class submarines of the Brazilian Navy
Ships built in Barrow-in-Furness
1972 ships